Geothermal power in Germany is expected to grow, mainly because of a law that benefits the production of geothermal electricity and guarantees a feed-in tariff. Less than 0.4 percent of Germany's total primary energy supply came from geothermal sources in 2004. But after a renewable energy law that introduced a tariff scheme of EU €0.15 [US $0.23] per kilowatt-hour (kWh) for electricity produced from geothermal sources came into effect that year, a construction boom was sparked and the new power plants are now starting to come online.

History
The first German geothermal power plant was built in 2003 in Neustadt-Glewe located in northern Germany. This plant was not just the first one operating with the Organic Rankine cycle (ORC) technology but also with the lowest temperature. This first project proved that the generation of electricity from geothermal sources at low temperature levels is possible in Germany.

Sustainability
In the same year (2003) the TAB (bureau for technological impact assessment of the German Bundestag) concluded that Germany's geothermal resources could be used to supply the entire base load of the country. This conclusion has regard to the fact that geothermal sources have to be developed sustainably because they can cool out if overused.

See also 
 Renewable energy in Germany
 Wind power in Germany
 Solar power in Germany
 Renewable energy by country

References

Geothermal energy in Germany
Renewable energy in Germany